Nancy Tuana is an American philosopher who specializes in feminist philosophy. She holds the DuPont/Class of 1949 Professorship in Philosophy and Women's Studies at The Pennsylvania State University.  She came to Penn State from the University of Oregon in 2001 to serve as the founding director of the Rock Ethics Institute. She won the 2022 Victoria Davion Award.

Career 

The Rock Ethics Institute, under her direction, has taken the lead nationally and internationally in developing innovative and deeply interdisciplinary modes of engaging in socially relevant ethics research through embedding ethical analysis into research in the sciences and engineering and by catalyzing research on ethically responsible policy making.  Current research foci include climate change ethics, food ethics, industry sponsorship of research, global ethics, critical philosophy of race, and moral literacy and moral development.  While Director, Tuana secured twelve tenure track ethics hires in order to support the Institute's commitment to serve as a catalyst for deeply interdisciplinary ethics research and the infusion of ethics across the Penn State curriculum.

Tuana's scholarly work ranges across the field of feminist philosophy and engages approaches from both Continental and American philosophical traditions.  Her scholarly work includes books and articles in feminist history of philosophy, feminist science studies, and feminist epistemology. Her current research foci are twofold.  The first is in the field of feminist analyses of anthropocentric climate change in which she has published a number of articles and working on a forthcoming book.  The second is a focus on corporeal and genealogical temporality, the topic of a recent course at the Collegium Phaenomenologicum she co-taught with Charles Scott.

She is series editor for Re-Reading the Canon with Penn State Press; the series has over thirty volumes.  She also served as co-editor with Laurie Shrage of Hypatia: A Journal of Feminist Philosophy.  With Joan Callahan, she created Feminist Philosophers: In Their Own Words. She was the editor for the APA Newsletter on Feminism and Philosophy from its inception until 1992.  She has also guest edited special issues of Hypatia on the topics of feminism and science, epistemologies of ignorance, and feminism and climate change.  She has also served as guest editor for three special issues of the journal Critical Philosophy of Race. She was Director of two NEH Summer Seminars on Feminist Epistemology, the latter of which resulted in the conference on "Ethics and the Epistemologies of Ignorance." She served as a co-editor of the feminist philosophy topic area for the Stanford Encyclopedia of Philosophy.

Publications

References

Living people
Year of birth missing (living people)
American feminists
American women philosophers
Feminist philosophers
American ethicists
Pennsylvania State University faculty
21st-century American women